The 1986 All-Ireland Senior Club Camogie Championship for the leading clubs in the women's team field sport of camogie was won by Glen Rovers, who defeated St Paul’s from Kilkenny by one point in an exciting and robust final, played at Glen Rovers. An injury to the iconic St Paul’s star Angela Downey after she had scored two comeback goals, was a factor in Glen Rovers victory.

Arrangements
The championship was organised on the traditional provincial system used in Gaelic Games since the 1880s, with Athenry, and Eglish, winning the championships of the other two provinces. Angela Downey scored 7–5 for St Paul's in their semi-final defeat of Eglish.

The Final
Glen Rovers won the final by a single point having lost a six-point lead in the closing stages. Angela Downey scored two snap goals for St Paul's before suffering a nasty injury and had to leave the field in an often robust final. Val Fitzpatrick was named Player of the Match. Anne O'Donovan became the first player to be sent off in an All Ireland camogie final at any level.

Final stages

References

External links
 Camogie Association

1986 in camogie
1986